is a district of Hanamigawa Ward, Chiba City, Chiba Prefecture, Japan, consisting of 1-chōme to 7-chōme.

History
The  was adopted in a part of Makuharicho on 1 March 1982 and on 1 January 1985, which was respectively renamed Makuharihongo 4-chōme to 7-chōme and 1-chōme to 3-chōme.

Geography
The district is located on the western part of Hanamigawa Ward. It borders Makuharicho to the east, Makuhari-nishi to the south, Saginuma and Saginumadai to the west, Hanasaki and Yashiki to the north.

Demographics
The number of households and population as of January 2018 are shown below.

Transportation
 Keiyo Road Makuhari IC

Railroads
 JR East – Chūō-Sōbu Line
 
 Keisei Electric Railway – Keisei Chiba Line

Buses
 Keisei Bus
 Makuharihongō Station - Makuharihongō 5-chōme - Makuharihongō 7-chōme

Education
 Chiba Municipal Nishinoya Elementary School (1-chōme to 3-chōme)
 Chiba Municipal Uenodai Elementary School (4-chōme to 7-chōme)
 Chiba Municipal Makuharihongo Junior High School

Historical sites

See also
 Makuhari

References

External links
 Fusanokuni Cultural Property Navigation

Chiba (city)